Ozbak may refer to:
 Ozbak, East Azerbaijan
 Ozbak, Kaleybar, East Azerbaijan Province
 Ozbak, South Khorasan